Text R of the rongorongo corpus, the smaller of two tablets in Washington and therefore also known as the Small Washington tablet, is one of two dozen surviving rongorongo texts.

Other names
R is the standard designation, from Barthel (1958). Fischer (1997) refers to it as RR15.

This piece is commonly known as Atua Mata Riri, after the first name in a chant that Ure Vae Iko sang to a photograph of one of Jaussen's tablets, possibly B or H. The error, if it is one, may be due to a misattribution in the Smithsonian publication of Thomson's book (Fischer).

Location
Department of Anthropology, National Museum of Natural History, Smithsonian Institution, Washington. Catalog # A129773. 

There is a reproduction in the Musée de l'Homme, Paris.

Description
A short, curved, unfluted tablet, 24 × 9 × 1.8 cm, pitted and with one end broken off, made of unknown wood. There is a hole in the middle of the straight edge, probably for hanging. Short segments of the four middle lines have been obliterated on the right side of side b.

Provenance
In December 1886, Thomson bought both Washington tablets on Easter Island with the mediation of his Tahitian aide Alexander Salmon "after a great deal of trouble and at considerable expense". He gave both to the Smithsonian in April 1890.

The Smithsonian catalog says,
Catalog Number A129773-0
Collector(s)      Maj. William Judah Thomson
Collection Date     18 Dec - 31 Dec 1886
Accession Number     023098
Donor Name     Thomson, William Judah
Accession Date     1890-Apr-19
INSCRIBED WOODEN TABLET OBTAINED BY W. J. THOMSON, PAYMASTER OF THE U.S. NAVY SHIP 'MOHICAN' IN EASTER ISLAND, DECEMBER 1886. TABLET WAS PURCHASED FROM MR. A. A. SALMON [a.k.a. Tati Salmon], A EUROPEAN SETTLER AND LONG-TIME RESIDENT OF EASTER ISLAND. THOMSON STATES TABLET IS MADE OF NATIVE TOROMIRO WOOD. TABLET IS DISCUSSED AND ILLUSTRATED IN THE USNM ANNUAL REPORT FOR 1889 (PP. 514, 520, 537). TRANSFERRED FROM ETHNOLOGY TO ARCHEOLOGY ON MAY 2, 1933. FORMERLY ON EXHIBIT NMNH HALL 8, UNIT 4.

3 PLASTER CASTS [A129773-1] MADE OF BOTH REVERSE AND OBVERSE SIDES.
This rongorongo tablet or board is sometimes referred to as the Atua Mata Riri tablet. It is also known as the Small Washington tablet. It is illus. Fig. 48, p. 76, in "Splendid Isolation: Art of Easter Island" by Eric Kjellgren, Metropolitan Museum of Art/Yale University Press, 2001, and identified there as an inscribed tablet (kohau rongorongo).
From card for 129773-4: "Engraved with shark's tooth. Transferred to Div. Archeology May 2, 1933."

From second card formerly in Ethnology card file: "No. 129,773: Illus. in USNM AR, 1889; Pl. 38 and 39 [after p. 520]. Translation on p. 520; note on p. 537. Description of acquisition on Easter Island p. 514. Cast made and sent to Musee d' Ethnographic, May, 1933. Loaned to Museum of Modern Art 8-1-84. Returned from Museum of Modern Art 10-4-1985."

Contents
Nearly all of R consists of sequences found in other texts (Pozdniakov and Pozdniakov 2007).

Text
Side a has eight lines (Fischer suspects there may once have been nine), and side b nine lines, for ~ 460 glyphs in all. The edges of the tablet are inscribed. 

Barthel

Side a, as traced by Barthel. The lines have been rearranged to reflect English reading order: Ra1 at top, Ra8 at bottom.

Side b: Rb1 at top, Rb9 (destroyed) at bottom.

Fischer

Image gallery

References
 BARTHEL, Thomas S. 1958. Grundlagen zur Entzifferung der Osterinselschrift (Bases for the Decipherment of the Easter Island Script). Hamburg : Cram, de Gruyter.
 FISCHER, Steven Roger. 1997. RongoRongo, the Easter Island Script: History, Traditions, Texts. Oxford and N.Y.: Oxford University Press.
 POZDNIAKOV, Konstantin and Igor POZDNIAKOV (2007). "Rapanui Writing and the Rapanui Language: Preliminary Results of a Statistical Analysis". Forum for Anthropology and Culture 3: 3–36.
 THOMSON, William J. 1891. "Te Pito te Henua, or Easter Island". Report of the United States National Museum for the Year Ending June 30, 1889. Annual Reports of the Smithsonian Institution for 1889. 447-552. Washington: Smithsonian Institution. (An online version is available www.sacred-texts.com/pac/ei here)

External links
Barthel's coding of text R
High-res color images from the Smithsonian

Rongorongo inscriptions